The Demyanka is a river in the Omsk Oblast and Tyumen Oblast, Russia. It is a right tributary of the Irtysh. The river's source lies in the Vasyugan Swamp.

The river bed is unbranched, strongly meandering. The bottom of the river bed is either ooze or sandy. During the spring rise of the water level, the river partially becomes navigable. The riverbed in shallow water is cluttered with fallen trees and bushes. The sloping longitudinal slope is insignificant - 0.034 ‰. Ice drifting takes place on the rise of high water.

The Demyanka basin is significantly swampy: 50% of it is covered by marshes, 45% by forest. Small lakes are numerous, but their surface area does not exceed 2.0%.

On the river there is the settlement of Demyanka, but on the whole the Demyanka basin is sparsely populated. There are no large settlements.

References 

Rivers of Omsk Oblast
Rivers of Tyumen Oblast